Yasin Avcı (born 3 August 1984) is a Turkish professional football midfielder, who is currently unattached.

References

External links
AC Horsens profile
Career statistics at Danmarks Radio
 Boldklubben Frem profile

1984 births
Living people
Turkish footballers
Danish men's footballers
Hvidovre IF players
Boldklubben Frem players
AC Horsens players
Danish Superliga players
Turkish emigrants to Denmark
Association football midfielders